The German Rectors' Conference/Hochschulrektorenkonferenz (HRK) is the voluntary association of state and state-recognised universities and other higher education institutions in Germany. It currently has 257 member institutions at which more than 96 per cent of all students in Germany are registered.

See also
 Open access in Germany

External links 
 hrk.de, official website

Organisations based in Bonn
Higher education in Germany